A luggage carrier, also commonly called a (bicycle) rack, is a device attached to a bicycle to which cargo or panniers can be attached. This is popular with utility bicycles and touring bicycles.

Bicycle luggage carriers may be mounted on the front or rear of a bicycle. The rear mount is more common. Racks on the front are mostly reserved for utility and cargo bikes. A special type of front rack is a low rider which is mainly used for bicycle touring.

The term luggage carrier can also refer to a device with two wheels used to wheel luggage or something of similar weight from one place to another, similar to a dolly (hand truck) but lighter and usually able to be folded up.

Mounting 

Bicycles may have eyelets, tapped with a standard thread, at the dropouts on the rear chainstays, and on the front fork blades. Mounting a bike rack is possible without these eyelets, but requires additional hardware. A style of rack clamps only to the seatpost, does not require eyelets or additional hardware, but has a limited capacity.

Luggage carriers can be mounted on recumbents and on folding bicycles, but may require customization or additional hardware. Additionally, specialized or customized luggage carriers are often required on bicycles with (rear) disc brakes or full suspension.

A common type of child seat designed for carrying an infant on a bicycle mounts to a rear luggage carrier. Some models of child seat are not attached to a luggage carrier but are fixed to the seat tube.

Some luggage carriers come in more than one size to accommodate different sized frames. A common variation is for there to be a different model for road bicycles and mountain bikes.

Capacity 

Rear-mounted luggage carriers are typically designed and tested for a maximum load of 25 kg (55lb), some models even for up to 40 kg (90lb). For front-mounted carriers, a typical design load limit might be 2×10 kg (2 x 20lb). Most luggage carriers are not designed to withstand the weight of an adult person.

Construction 

Luggage carriers are commonly constructed from aluminum, steel, or some combination of the two. Components may consist of tubing, extrusions, or castings. They may be welded, riveted, or bolted together.

Panniers may be mounted to front and rear luggage carriers. Removable panniers hook onto the top edge of the carrier and then are held in place by a spring or elastic cord that hooks near the wheel axle at the bottom. Some luggage carriers have an extra, lower, rail to hang panniers on, this provides better stability and more space on the platform.

Some bikes, such as longtail bicycles, porteur bicycles, or the Dutch typical transportfiet, may be built with an integrated front or rear luggage carrier. These are usually tested to a higher weight capacity.

In Europe, it is common for rear racks to have a mounting point for a reflector or rear light. It is common for the mounting point to have 2 holes which fits M5 bolts, spaced 50 or 80 mm (2" or 3") apart.

Standards
 European Standard EN 14872: Bicycles – Accessories for bicycles – Luggage carriers, British Standards Institution, 2006. EN 14872
 International Standard ISO 11243: Cycles – Luggage carriers for bicycles – Concepts, classification and testing, International Organization for Standardization 2016. In this ISO carriers can be fastened an EN 14344 child seat, using the seat fixing brackets. ISO 11243:2016

Image gallery

See also
Bicycle basket
Bicycle wheel
Gear case
Cargo bike
Outline of cycling
Low rider bicycle luggage carrier
Mudguard
Utility cycling
Xtracycle (an extreme form of bicycle mounted luggage carrier)

References

Bicycle parts